Ludwig Blochberger (born 3 December 1982) is a German actor. He is best known for his appearance in the coming of age movie Summer Storm dealing with issues around sexual orientation. He also appeared on German TV drama programmes including The Old Fox, Tatort and Brittany Mystery. Furthermore he portrayed the Chancellor Helmut Schmidt, in the TV documentary drama Helmut Schmidt - Lebensfragen.

Early life
Ludwig Blochberger was born in 1982 in East Berlin. His father Lutz Blochberger (an actor and director) and his mother Gitta Blochberger (a puppeteer) studied at this time at the Ernst Busch Academy of Dramatic Arts in Berlin. In 1984, the family moved to Dresden, due to the theater engagements of the two parents. In 1990, Ludwig attended the Kreuzschule in Dresden for one year. Then in 1992 they moved to Vienna, and he stayed with the Vienna Boys' Choir until 1995. With this famous Austrian boys choir, he got to know the world early via the joint concert tours (Japan, Australia, USA). In 1995, he had his first theater appearance, he participated in the open air theater in Chur (in Switzerland) in the theater production of Woyzeck. Then he could continue with other performances at the Vienna Burgtheater, among other things, he played Prince Edward III in the production of Edward II, directed by Claus Peymann. In 1999, Ludwig returned to his native Berlin and in 2000, he starred in the multi-award-winning TV three-part mini-series The Manns - Novel of a Century, as the role of 'Klaus Heuser', alongside actor Armin Mueller-Stahl. In the same year, he ended his school career and one year later began his acting studies at the Ernst Busch Academy of Dramatic Arts.

While still a drama student, he was in the cinema production of Summer Storm (directed by Marco Kreuzpaintner) and also in the 2006 Oscar-winning film  The Lives of Others (directed by Florian Henckel von Donnersmarck). Then in the TV movie Der Vater meiner Schwester, (directed by Christoph Stark), a family drama in which Ludwig starred together with Katharina Schüttler and Christian Berkel, which premiered at the Munich Film Festival and earned him an Undine Award nomination for Best Young Actor (TV). In 2005, he completed his acting training and worked in three episodes of Tatort, among others, he played a leading role as directed by Niki Stein. In the movie The Last Train (directed by Joseph Vilsmaier & Dana Vávrová), he played the unscrupulous SS Obersturmführer Crewes, who escorted one of the last deportation trains to Auschwitz.

Among his most important theatrical works to date include the productions of director Hans Neuenfels, who in 2005 brought him to Bochum for his world premiere of Schumann, Schubert und der Schnee, an "opera for piano" at the Ruhrtriennale (arts festival in Ruhr). Ludwig played the role of Franz Schubert alongside the baritone singer Olaf Bär in this fictional encounter between the two musical geniuses. For this production, there is also a 60-minute film documentary by director Enrique Sánchez Lansch Sound of the Ruhr. In 2007, Neuenfels cast him in the title role of Baal, written by Bertolt Brecht, at the Münchner Volkstheater. In the same year Ludwig also played for the first time under the direction of his father Lutz Blochberger, in the main role in the world premiere of the tragicomedy Heil Hitler!, by the playwright Rolf Hochhuth at the Academy of Arts, Berlin.

In 2011, he performed in Heinrich und Kleist an opera by Gerhard Wimberger in Frankfurt, alongside Deborah Kaufmann and Torsten Spohn.

Then in 2013, Ludwig played the German ex-Chancellor Helmut Schmidt, in the TV documentary drama Helmut Schmidt - Lebensfragen (Director: Ben von Grafenstein). This TV film was broadcast on the occasion of the 95th birthday of Helmut Schmidt on 23 December 2013 on the ARD channel. In the same year he took over the continuous role of Inspector Riwal, in the ARD series Brittany Mystery, which is based on the successful stories of the author Jean-Luc Bannalec and based in Brittany (France). Since fall 2015, Ludwig and Stephanie Stumph play in the ZDF channel crime series The Old Fox, the commissioner 'Tom Kupfer', alongside of Jan-Gregor Kremp as Chief Inspector 'Richard Voss'.

Personal life
Ludwig Blochberger is also a singer and guitarist in the band 'GENIEßEN & LEIDEN' ('Enjoy and Suffer'), which he founded together with the actors Roman Roth and Thimo Meitner in autumn 2017. His father was a Protestant and his sister 
was baptized.

Filmography

Film

Television

References

External links 

 
 www.ludwigblochberger.com - official website

1982 births
Living people
People from East Berlin
German male television actors
German male film actors
German male stage actors
People educated at the Kreuzschule
20th-century German male actors
21st-century German male actors